Rudgwick  is a village and civil parish in the Horsham District of West Sussex, England. The parish's northern boundary forms part of the county boundary between Surrey and West Sussex.

The 2001 Census recorded 2,791 people living in 1,013 households, of whom 1,425 were economically active.. The 2011 Census recorded a population, including Tisman's Common of 2,722.

History
Historically Ridgewick was an alternative form of the toponym. Riccherwyk may be another, seen in 1377.

The Church of England parish church of the Holy Trinity has a 12th-century Norman font of Sussex Marble. The belltower is early 13th century. The church was largely rebuilt in the 14th century, when the north aisle was added and probably the present chancel was built.

The parish has two 17th century farmhouses.

Rudgwick had a Dissenters' chapel by 1848.

Rudgwick railway station on the Cranleigh Line was opened in 1865 and closed in 1965, as part of the Beeching cuts.

Education
Pennthorpe School is on in Church Street.
Rudgwick Primary School is located in the community.

The Rikkyo School in England, a Japanese boarding school, is also located in Rudgwick.

Notable people
Bertram Prance (1889-1958), artist and illustrator, lived in the village.
Eric Thompson (1929–1982), creator of The Magic Roundabout grew up in Rudgwick.

References

Sources

External links

Horsham District
Villages in West Sussex